Milada Karbanová, married Matoušová (born 27 March 1948 in Jablonec nad Nisou) is a retired high jumper from the Czech Republic. She won four medals at the European Indoor Championships as well as a silver medal at the 1974 European Championships in Athletics, representing Czechoslovakia. She also competed in the women's high jump at the 1972 Summer Olympics and the 1976 Summer Olympics.

Achievements

References

External links
GBR Athletics

1948 births
Living people
Czech female high jumpers
Czechoslovak female high jumpers
Sportspeople from Jablonec nad Nisou
European Athletics Championships medalists
Athletes (track and field) at the 1972 Summer Olympics
Athletes (track and field) at the 1976 Summer Olympics
Olympic athletes of Czechoslovakia